Dragutin Petrovečki (born 31 January 1914, date of death unknown) was a Croatian rower who competed for Yugoslavia. He competed in the men's single sculls event at the 1948 Summer Olympics.

References

External links
 

1914 births
Year of death missing
Croatian male rowers
Olympic rowers of Yugoslavia
Rowers at the 1948 Summer Olympics
People from Bedekovčina